Midland Mainline was a train operating company in the United Kingdom owned by National Express that operated the Midland Main Line franchise from April 1996 until November 2007. Midland Mainline ran fast and semi-fast passenger services from London to the East Midlands and Yorkshire, on the Midland Main Line.

History
The Midland Mainline franchise was awarded by the Director of Passenger Rail Franchising to National Express for a period of ten years with operations commencing on 28 April 1996. In May 1999 Midland Mainline was able to extend its sphere of operation after receiving new rolling stock. In August 2000 the Shadow Strategic Rail Authority awarded a two-year extension in return for National Express committing to invest including ordering new rolling stock and running an hourly service to Leeds.

Service patterns
The off peak service pattern, upon conclusion of the franchise in November 2007, consisted of four departures per hour from London St Pancras. There were two fast and two semi-fast trains per hour. The hourly pattern from St Pancras was as below:

xx00: semi-fast to Derby, calling at:
Luton Airport Parkway
Bedford
Wellingborough
Kettering
Market Harborough
Leicester
Loughborough
Long Eaton
Derby
Extension to Burton upon Trent calling at:
Willington
Burton upon Trent
Extension to Barnsley, generally calling at:
Belper
Chesterfield
Dronfield occasional service
Sheffield
Meadowhall
Barnsley
Extension to Scarborough (Saturdays). This service called at Scarborough during part of the summer timetable only, all other times this service terminated at York. This service called at:
Chesterfield
Sheffield
Meadowhall
Doncaster
York
Scarborough

This service was operated by four or five carriage Class 222 Meridians.

xx25: fast to Sheffield, generally calling just at:
Leicester
Derby
Chesterfield
Sheffield
This train forms the limited (see below) extension to Leeds generally calling at:
Doncaster
Wakefield
Leeds
Extension to York (Sundays) calling at:
Doncaster
York

This service was generally operated by High Speed Trains, although a few diagrams use eight-carriage Class 222 Meridians

xx30: semi-fast to Nottingham, calling at:
Luton
Bedford
Wellingborough
Kettering
Market Harborough
Leicester
Loughborough
Beeston
Nottingham
with a journey time of 1 hour 56 minutes

This service was operated by four or five carriage Class 222 Meridians

xx55: fast to Nottingham, generally calling at:
Leicester
Loughborough (every hour or two)
Nottingham
with a journey time of 1 hour 41 minutes

This service was generally operated by eight-carriage Class 222 Meridians although sometimes a Class 43 High Speed Train was used.

All Midland Mainline services (except The Master Cutler morning up service) called at Leicester with the fastest journey time to and from London of 1 hour 9 minutes.
The services between London, Luton and Bedford supplemented the high frequency Thameslink and later First Capital Connect commuter service.

Limited services

Midland Mainline operated a limited service between St Pancras and Leeds, with three early morning departures from Leeds and four evening return trips from St Pancras. This was principally because Midland Mainline's HSTs were maintained at Neville Hill depot. The timings did not compare favourably with the principal service from London King's Cross to Leeds along the East Coast Main Line with the Midland Main Line having a much slower line speed. The journey time on the Midland route is around 3 hours 15 minutes vs 2 hours 15 minutes via the East Coast.

In July 1996, a bus service between Kettering and Corby was introduced.

From May 1999, a small number of through trains from St Pancras to Burton upon Trent and Barnsley were introduced as well as stops at Belper and Meadowhall.

From May 2000, through trains between St Pancras and Matlock were introduced, ceasing in December 2004 when Class 222s were introduced, as they were not allowed on the Derwent Valley Line branch line. Also in May 2000 Midland Mainline began operating one Saturday service between St Pancras and York via Doncaster. In summer it would continue to Scarborough. On Sunday a service to York started at Leicester, with the return service being via the Erewash Valley Line to Nottingham, where it reversed before proceeding to St Pancras.

A small number of trains operated between St Pancras and Sheffield via Nottingham and along the Erewash Valley Line to Chesterfield serving Langley Mill and Alfreton.

Project Rio
From May 2003 until September 2004, Midland Mainline operated an hourly service between St Pancras and Manchester Piccadilly; this was at the request of the Strategic Rail Authority whilst the West Coast Main Line between London Euston and Manchester underwent engineering work using former Virgin CrossCountry High Speed Trains. This temporary service was named Project Rio after the similarity of the route to footballer Rio Ferdinand's recent transfer movements. He first transferred from West Ham United to Leeds United, then later crossed the Pennines in a £30 million record transfer to Manchester United.

The service used the Midland Main Line as far as Trent Junction, before taking the Erewash Valley Line (avoiding Derby) to Clay Cross, rejoining the Midland Main Line until Dore South Junction, using Dore Tunnel Curve to join the Hope Valley Line westwards towards Manchester Piccadilly. South of Leicester, the service ran in the path of the xx:30 semi-fast Nottingham train, with an additional Leicester to Nottingham service introduced using the displaced Class 170 Turbostar.

Named trains
The Robin Hood on the 06:30 Sheffield to St Pancras via Nottingham, and returning as the 17:00 St Pancras to Nottingham.
The Master Cutler on the 06:14 Leeds to St Pancras which runs non stop from Chesterfield, and 16:55 St Pancras to Leeds return.
The Midlands Express on the 07:05 Sheffield to St Pancras.

Rolling stock
Midland Mainline inherited a fleet of High Speed Trains from British Rail. Enhancements were carried out to the power cars of the HSTs, most notably a revised lighting cluster.

In April 1997 Midland Mainline ordered 13 (later expanded to 17) Class 170 Turbostars to operate stopping services. Originally all were ordered as two-carriage sets before it was decided to increase 10 to three-carriage sets. The first entered service in May 1999 and allowed a new timetable with increased frequencies to be introduced with the Class 170s operating most of the stops south of Leicester, allowing the HSTs to be better used on the longer-distance services.

To cover for a shortage of HSTs, Midland Mainline hired two Fragonset Class 47 locomotives to top and tail a set of HSBC Rail Mark 2 carriages on a morning service from Nottingham to London St Pancras and evening return to Sheffield from February 2002. In October 2002 Midland Mainline was able to replace these, after leasing an additional five HST power cars and two sets of Mark 3 carriages that had been released by Virgin CrossCountry.

In February 2002 Midland Mainline ordered sixteen four-carriage and seven nine-carriage Class 222 Meridian trains based on Virgin CrossCountry's Class 220 Voyager, but with developments to improve passenger comfort and address some of the criticisms aimed at the Voyager. The first entered service in May 2004. The four-carriage sets replaced the Class 170s, which were transferred to Central Trains, while the nine-carriage sets were ordered to operate a new service from London St Pancras to Leeds via Nottingham and the Erewash Valley Line. When the Strategic Rail Authority ruled that there was not enough demand for this service, the nine-carriage sets were left sitting idle until eventually they were put into use on the services between Nottingham/Sheffield and London St Pancras from July 2005, releasing one HST for hire to First Great Western while it refurbished its fleet and two other HSTs to GNER to allow that operator to run extra services to Leeds from May 2007.

As the nine-carriage Meridians were lightly loaded while the four-carriage sets were overcrowded, it was decided in 2006 to reduce all of the nine-carriage sets to eight carriages, the removed carriages then being used to extend seven of the four-carriage sets to five carriages. A further reconfiguration of the Meridians took place in 2008, shortly after East Midlands Trains took over Midland Mainline's services, when six of the eight-carriage sets were reduced to seven carriages and the remaining set was reduced to five carriages, allowing all nine of the remaining four-carriage sets to be extended to five carriages.

To operate the Project Rio services to Manchester Piccadilly, 23 HST power cars and associated Mark 3 carriages were transferred from Virgin CrossCountry in May 2003. Whilst these were undergoing overhaul, a First Great Western HST was hired from May 2003 until February 2004. When Project Rio concluded in September 2004, some were transferred to First Great Western and GNER, while others went into store.

Midland Mainline's fleet consisted of the following trains at the time they ceased operating:

Final fleet

Previous fleet

Stations
Midland Mainline operated at twenty-seven stations, of which it managed eight:
London St Pancras, Wellingborough, Kettering, Market Harborough, Leicester, Derby, Chesterfield and Sheffield.

Other stations served included:
Luton Airport Parkway, Luton, Bedford Midland, Loughborough, Long Eaton, Willington, Burton upon Trent, Beeston, Nottingham, Langley Mill, Alfreton, Dronfield, Meadowhall, Barnsley, Doncaster, Wakefield Westgate, Leeds, York, Scarborough.

Stations which used to be served but then had their Midland Mainline services stop before the franchise ended:
Duffield, Ambergate, Whatstandwell, Cromford, Matlock Bath, Matlock, Stockport, Manchester Piccadilly.

Depot
Midland Mainline's HSTs were maintained at Neville Hill with the rest of the fleet at Derby Etches Park.

Demise

As part of a redrawing of the rail franchise map from November 2007, the Midland Mainline franchise was combined with some Central Trains services into a new East Midlands franchise.

In September 2006 the Department for Transport (DfT) announced that National Express, Arriva, FirstGroup and Stagecoach had been shortlisted to bid for the new franchise. In June 2007 the DfT awarded the franchise to Stagecoach, with the services operated by Midland Mainline transferring to East Midlands Trains on 11 November 2007.

References

Further reading

Companies based in Derby
Defunct train operating companies
National Express companies
Railway companies established in 1997
Railway companies disestablished in 2007
1996 establishments in England
2007 disestablishments in England
British companies established in 1997
British companies disestablished in 2007